The Atlas Lacrosse Club is a professional men's field lacrosse team in Premier Lacrosse League (PLL). The Atlas are one of the six founding members of the PLL for the 2019 season.

Roster

Source:

(C): Captain

Coaching staff
 Head coach – Steven Brooks (interim)
 Assistant coach – Ken Clausen

All-time Draft selections
2019 College Draft

2020 Entry Draft

The 2020 player entry draft occurred on March 16 for teams to select players arriving from rival Major League Lacrosse. On March 4, Paul Burmeister and NBCSN hosted an entry draft lottery for selection order. Out of 100 balls to select from, Waterdogs had 40, Chrome had 25, Atlas had 15, Archers had 10, Chaos had 6, Redwoods had 3, and the champion Whipsnakes had 1.

Rob Pannell was announced to be transferring to the PLL on March 9, followed by 15 other players the following day, which comprised the selection pool for the entry draft. A total of 14 players were selected in the entry draft with remaining new players entering the league player pool.

2020 College Draft

2021 Entry Draft

2021 College Draft

2022 College Draft

Season Results

PLL Award Winners
Paul Cantabene Faceoff Athlete of the Year
 Trevor Baptiste: 2019, 2021
George Boiardi Short Stick Midfielder of the Year
 Danny Logan: 2021
Rookie of the Year
 Jeff Teat: 2021
Dave Huntley Sportsmanship Award
 Eric Law: 2021

Head coaches

All-time record vs. PLL Clubs

References

See also

Premier Lacrosse League teams
Lacrosse clubs established in 2019